Sint Maartensvlotbrug is a village in the Dutch province of North Holland. It is a part of the municipality of Schagen, and lies about 15 km northwest of Heerhugowaard.

The village is named after a vlotbrug constructed near the village of Sint Maartensbrug. Originally it was a wooden bridge built between 1820 and 1821. In 1959, it was replaced by a steel pontoon bridge operated by an electro motor. The village was first mentioned between 1839 and 1859.

References

Schagen
Populated places in North Holland